Goto, also known as arroz caldo con goto, is a Filipino rice and beef tripe gruel cooked with ginger and garnished with toasted garlic, scallions, black pepper, and chicharon. It is usually served with calamansi, soy sauce, or fish sauce (patis) as condiments, as well as a hard-boiled egg. It is a type of lugaw.

Etymology
The original complete name of the dish is arroz caldo con goto or arroz con goto, derived from Spanish arroz ("rice") and caldo ("soup"); as well as Tagalog goto ("tripe").  Tagalog goto, ultimately derives from Hokkien 牛肚 (gû-tǒ͘, "ox tripe").

Description
Goto typically uses glutinous rice (malagkit), but can also be made with regular rice boiled with an excess of water. It is prepared almost identically to arroz caldo. Rice is cooked with water infused with ginger, then garnished with toasted garlic, scallions, black pepper, and crumbled chicharon. They are served on individual bowls while hot. The tripe is cooked separately until very tender. They are typically cut into longitudinal strips before being added into the rice, along with a hard-boiled egg. Beef tripe can be substituted with other offal, like pig intestines.

Safflower (kasubha) may be added to give the dish a yellow color, though it is not traditional unlike in arroz caldo. It is commonly paired with tokwa't baboy (cubed tofu and pork). It is usually served with calamansi, soy sauce, or fish sauce (patis) as condiments. Goto is typically served as breakfast or as hangover food.

See also
Bubur ayam
Ginataang mais

References

Rice dishes
Philippine desserts
Philippine rice dishes
Beef dishes
Pork dishes
Cereal dishes
Chinese-Filipino culture
Chinese fusion cuisine
Philippine fusion cuisine
Chinese cuisine outside China